Kuma is the Django-based platform that powers Mozilla Developer Network hosted on GitHub. It is open source software licensed under Mozilla Public License 2.0. The main function of the platform is to gather people around MDN, who can contribute to all the documentation stored and maintained as part of the project, including JavaScript API available in modern web browsers. It has advanced translation tools available as well.

Current design assumes installation on Vagrant controlled virtual machines (configuration includes Ansible).

References 

Free software
2010 software